Stephen Cooper or Steve Cooper is the name of:

Stephen Cooper (American football) (born 1979), San Diego Chargers linebacker
Steve Cooper (footballer, born 1955), English footballer
Steve Cooper (footballer, born 1964) (1964–2004), English footballer
Steve Cooper (footballer, born 1979), Welsh football manager and former player
Stephen Cooper (writer), American academic, biographer and fiction writer
Stephen Cooper (ice hockey) (born 1966), British ice hockey player
Stephen Cooper (businessman), CEO of Warner Music Group
Stephen Cooper (athlete), paralympic athlete from Great Britain